The Old Winters Ranch/Winters Mansion, near Carson City, Nevada, was completed in 1864.  Also known as Rancho del Sierra, it was listed on the National Register of Historic Places in 1974. It was argued to be significant for its historical associations, for its architecture, and for its "continuing educational possibilities."

It is located in Washoe City, Nevada.

References 

National Register of Historic Places in Washoe County, Nevada
Gothic Revival architecture in Nevada
Residential buildings completed in 1864
Ranches on the National Register of Historic Places in Nevada
Houses in Washoe County, Nevada
1862 establishments in Nevada Territory
Nevada historical markers